Gargoyles is an American made-for-television fantasy horror film, directed by B. W. L. Norton, and originally broadcast Tuesday, November 21, 1972, for CBS' The New CBS Tuesday Night Movies. It was the first film to feature the make-up work of special effects artist Stan Winston, for which he shared the 1973 Emmy Award for Outstanding Achievement in Makeup.

Plot
Dr. Mercer Boley and his daughter Diana are traveling in New Mexico for his scientific research. They are shown a skeleton of a large creature with wings and horns at a place called Uncle Willie's Desert Museum. Dr. Boley dismisses it as a hoax assembled from unrelated bones, but Uncle Willie insists that he found the bones together as a whole skeleton. While Uncle Willie tells them tales of demons from American Indian folklore, an unseen force attacks the building, causing a rafter to collapse and kill the proprietor, and starting a fire that consumes the building. Dr. Boley and Diana escape with the horned skull and take it to a motel.

The next morning they report to the police and return to the site of the fire. There they find a group of young men, James Reeger and four others, riding motorcycles around the ruins. The police arrest them on suspicion of causing the fire, against the advice of the Boleys.

That night, two gargoyles, appearing much smaller than the skeleton and without horns or wings, invade the motel room to retrieve the skull. Dr. Boley chases them to the road where one is struck and killed by a truck and the other gets away with the skull. Boley takes the body back to the room. The alcoholic hotelier, Mrs. Parks, complains but Diana tries to assure her that it was only a family argument.

Diana returns to the police station and pleads for the bikers' innocence but the deputy says only a judge can release them after charges have been filed. She tells Reeger about the dead gargoyle but he mockingly suggests that she and her father are "smoking" something. She does not mention it to the police even though it would prove their innocence, apparently because her father wants it for study. She returns to the motel.

Two slightly larger gargoyles return to recover the gargoyle body, but the Boleys escape with it through the window and stow it in their station wagon. The gargoyles rip the passenger door off and kidnap Diana, then overturn the car rendering Dr. Boley unconscious. The gargoyles take Diana to their cave, where they have many eggs. She meets the gargoyle leader, who is larger and has wings and horns like the skeleton. He tells Diana that they have only been alive for a few weeks after a 500-year incubation, and that humans have repeatedly killed them off in the past, but he vows that they will survive this time. He has several of Dr. Boley's books, apparently also taken from the car, and insists that Diana read to him. As she reads a passage that describes a mythical encounter between a human female and a demon who molests her, the leader approaches from behind and startles her, but assures her that he has "no need for humans."

Dr. Boley convinces the police chief to release the bikers and search for Diana, and Reeger joins them. Mrs. Parks and her helper drive away to get assistance, but the search party later finds her pickup truck empty and bloodied, and her body hanging upside down from a telephone pole with no sign of the helper.

The gargoyle leader has a queen, who also has wings and speaks, and she informs him that "men, horses, and dogs" are approaching the cave, and that many more eggs will hatch the next day. The leader orders that the humans "must be stopped in the desert." Over a dozen gargoyles charge the humans and both sides have casualties.

The leader takes Dr. Boley to the cave and vows "this is the end of your age, the beginning of mine." The queen appears jealous of the leader's attention to Diana, and she leads Dr. Boley to his daughter and lets them escape. Reeger douses the eggs with gasoline but is attacked by several gargoyles before he can get away. While surrounded, he lights the fuel and sacrifices himself, thus also killing what appear to be the only remaining gargoyle soldiers.

When the leader realizes that his war is once again lost, Dr. Boley bludgeons the queen's wing with a rock so she cannot fly, and so the leader must carry her away. He flies away with her to create a new nest somewhere.

Cast
Cornel Wilde as Mercer Boley
Jennifer Salt as Diana Boley
Grayson Hall as Mrs. Parks
Bernie Casey as The Gargoyle
Scott Glenn as James Reeger
William Stevens as Police Chief
John Gruber as Jesse
Woody Chambliss as Uncle Willie
Jim Connell as Buddy
Tim Burns as Ray
Mickey Alzola
Greg Walker
Rock Walker as Gargoyles
Uncredited
Vic Perrin (opening narration and voice of Gargoyle leader)

References

External links

Gargoyles at Rotten Tomatoes

American supernatural horror films
Gargoyles in popular culture
American horror television films
1972 television films
1972 films
1970s American films